Édouard Salomon Crémieux (21 January 1856, Marseille – May 1944, Auschwitz) was a French painter of Jewish ancestry. He specialized in rural and coastal scenes.

Biography 
His father, Saul Appolon Crémieux (1826-1918) was a jeweler. Later, he worked with Tony Robert-Fleury. After that, he returned to Marseille.

He exhibited at the salon of the Association des Artistes Provençaux and at the Salon Rhodanien. In 1892, he was given honourable mention at the Paris Salon, followed by a third-class medal in 1897. For several years, he was Director of the Association des Artistes Marseillais.

He married Adrienne Sarah Ester Padova, who was fourteen years his junior,  in 1894. They had three sons, two of whom became well known: , a doctor, and Henri, a popular movie actor. Their third son, Gustave, died in 1925, when he was only twenty-two.

In April 1944 he, Adrienne and Albert were taken to the Drancy internment camp, then transferred to Auschwitz, where he was murdered on arrival. Adrienne followed shortly after. Possibly due to his profession, Albert survived.

References

Further reading
 Denis Coutagne, Bruno Ely, Jean-Roger Soubiran et al., Peintres de la couleur en Provence (1875-1920), Office Régional de la Culture Provence-Alpes-côte d'Azur", Marsiglia, 1995

External links 

 More works by Crémieux @ ArtNet

1856 births
1944 deaths
19th-century French painters
French genre painters
French landscape painters
Jewish painters
French people who died in Auschwitz concentration camp
Artists from Marseille
Drancy internment camp prisoners
20th-century French painters
French Jews who died in the Holocaust
French people executed in Nazi concentration camps
People killed by gas chamber by Nazi Germany